European Business Summit (EBS) is an events and conference organiser, and the creator of one of the largest networking and debating events in Brussels – the annual European Business Summit.

Description

EBS was founded in 2000 by the FEB (Federation of Enterprises in Belgium), and later joined in support by BUSINESS EUROPE. From the beginning its purpose was to bring together policy-makers and business leaders to discuss contemporary issues affecting the future of Europe, thus helping to improve the decision-making process on the EU-level.

EBS also organises the “Back from Davos” event, whose purpose is to follow up on the conclusions and achievements of the annual meetings of the World Economic Forum in Davos, Switzerland. The 2018 edition took place on January 30 in Brussels. It took a form of a conversation with Jyrki Katainen – EU Commissioner Jobs, Growth, Investment and Competitiveness and Daniela Vincenti, Editor-in-Chief at EurActiv.

Moreover, EBS supports events such as Think Digital, EU Energy Summit and the European Defence Industry Summit.

When organising its events EBS works with companies, associations, governments and regional representatives, NGOs, academia and think tanks from across multiple sectors.

Honorary board

The Honorary Board of the European Business Summit consists of a number of esteemed figures with significant achievements in the areas of politics and business.  Members of the Board include a former Italian Prime Minister Mario Monti, the President of BusinessEurope Emma Marcegaglia and the CEO of the Solvay Group Jean-Pierre Clamadieu among others.

Partnerships and patronage

EBS, under the provision of the Belgian Ministry of Foreign Affairs, is supported by the FEB (Federation of Enterprises in Belgium) and BusinessEurope. EBS also operates under the high patronage of His Majesty the King of the Belgians.

Annual European Business Summit

The European Business Summit (EBS) is the EBS’ annual flagship event organised in Brussels. Each year the Summit attracts more than 2,000 participants and 200 high-level speakers from over 60 countries. Previous guests and speakers include heads of state and government, European ministers, EU Commissioners, high-ranking individuals, civil society, and academia. Since 2014 the Summit has been organized in the Egmont Palace in Brussels, Belgium.

The Summit spans 2 days, beginning with an Opening Plenary, followed by numerous sessions dedicated to specific topics correlating with key negotiations taking place at the EU-level in a particular year. The sessions take different forms, from big roundtable discussions for around 200 participants, featuring EU Commissioners and high-level officials as speakers, to Agora discussions for around 100 participants, to more intimate “Meet the Expert sessions” which give the opportunity for the audience to interact with the speakers. The Summit concludes with a Closing Plenary session featuring a distinguished guest speaker. The event is complemented by networking lunches and evening gatherings during which all guests have the chance to exchange views and search for new opportunities for collaboration.

EBS 2017

The 2017 edition of EBS took place on May 22–23, 2017 and welcomed a wide range of high-level speakers for key moments including Minister Wolfgang Schäuble who spoke about Europe in a new world, CEO Jean-Pierre Clamadieu on Sustainable Development Goals, former Prime Minister Mario Monti on the future of the European economy, MEP Guy Verhofstadt on the future of Europe, and 10 EU Commissioners speaking on creating a new narrative for Europe.

EBS 2018

The 2018 edition of the Summit took place on May 23–24 in the Egmont Palace in Brussels. The theme of this edition was “Leading in a changing world: Europe at the forefront of global economic, social and political change”. The discussions focused on topics such as clean industry, ethics, trade, security and defence, digitalisation, energy and Brexit,

Media

Every year the Summit attracts significant media attention, with over 250 journalists from international and European media outlets attending the event. EBS offers media partners exclusive access to high-level speakers, private interview rooms and assistance in scheduling one-on-one meetings.

List of summits

'Knowledge partners' 
College of Europe
Hill+Knowlton Strategies
EurActiv
Copenhagen Economics

See also
Common Agricultural Policy
Defence policy of the European Union
Energy policy of the European Union
Environmental policy of the European Union
European Economic Area

References

External links 

 

International conferences in Belgium
Annual events in Europe
Lobbying in Europe